{{DISPLAYTITLE:Rho1 Sagittarii}}

Rho1 Sagittarii, Latinized from ρ1 Sagittarii, is a single, variable star in the southern constellation of Sagittarius. It has a white hue and is visible to the naked eye with an apparent visual magnitude that fluctuates around 3.93. The distance to this star is approximately 127 light years based on parallax, and it is drifting further away with a radial velocity of +1.2 km/s. It is positioned near the ecliptic and so it can be occulted by the Moon.

This object has a stellar classification of A9IV, matching a subgiant star that is evolving away from the main sequence. It is a low amplitude Delta Scuti variable, ranging from 3.94 to 3.90 magnitude with a period of 0.05 days. The star is 893 million years old and is spinning with a projected rotational velocity of 68 km/s. It has 1.9 times the mass of the Sun and 3.3 times the Sun's radius. The star is radiating 31 times the luminosity of the Sun from its photosphere at an effective temperature of 7,469 K.

References

A-type subgiants
Delta Scuti variables

Sagittarius (constellation)
Sagittarii, Rho1
BD-18 5322
Sagittarii, 44 5
4107
181577
095168 88
7340